Brachodes albina is a moth of the family Brachodidae. It is found in Russia.

Taxonomy
The taxonomic status of this species is unclear, it is possibly a synonym of Brachodes lucida.

References

External links
Images at babochki-kryma.narod.ru

Moths described in 1978
Brachodidae
Taxa named by Aleksei Konstantinovich Zagulyaev